Russell Harold Nype (April 26, 1920 – May 27, 2018) was an American actor and singer.

Early years 
Born in Zion, Illinois, Nype majored in speech and English at Lake Forest College, earning a bachelor's degree. In World War II, he served in the Army. Early in his New York career, press stories frequently mentioned his Illinois roots and religiously strict upbringing: "I come from the severest aspects of the Midwestern Bible belt. My family hasn't actually written me off because I'm in show business, but they'd be much happier if I concentrated my performances on singing hymns in church. My answer is that I couldn't support my wife and children."

Career 
After teaching ballroom dance and singing in nightclubs, Nype made his Broadway debut in Marc Blitzstein's opera Regina in 1949. The following year he won critical acclaim and both the Tony and Theatre World Awards for his performance opposite Ethel Merman in Call Me Madam. One Broadway columnist provided a measure of how quickly he rose from obscurity in the show: "A week ago, Russell Nype was such an unknown that Celebrity Service, which keeps files on performers, didn't even list his name. The day after he opened in Call Me Madam Celeb Service received 60 phone calls from agents, writers, and producers asking for background material on him, and his phone number. He gets featured billing in the show next week." Merman and Nype were reunited in 1970 when, late in the run of the original production of Hello, Dolly!, Merman joined the show in the title role and Nype was cast as Cornelius Hackl. Nype later appeared in revivals of Carousel, Brigadoon, and Morning's at Seven, and opposite Elaine Stritch in the short-lived musical Goldilocks, for which he won his second Tony. A Bucks County (PA) Playhouse engagement in 1960 was a revival of the 1935 play Petticoat Fever, with added new songs.

Nype caught Hollywood's attention early and was offered a role in MGM's Young Man in a Hurry. MGM released him after eight days of filming, and the movie eventually debuted with Glenn Ford as Young Man with Ideas in 1952. As Nype explained, "I realized from the outset that I was too young for the role. It was originally written for Jimmy Stewart and the character was supposed to be married 10 years and have three children--eight, five, and one years old....When the studio bosses saw the first eight days' rushes, they agreed with me that I was too young for the part."

Nype's feature film credits include Love Story (1970), Can't Stop the Music (1980) and The Stuff (1985). On television he appeared in Studio One, Fantasy Island, One Day at a Time, The Cosby Show, Murder, She Wrote, Who's the Boss?, and productions of One Touch of Venus, Kiss Me, Kate and Morning's at Seven.

Personal life 
Nype married Diantha Lawrence on 7 March 1953; she had been previously wed to Thomas Mander.

Death 
Nype died in West Palm Beach, Florida, on May 27, 2018, at the age of 98.

Filmography

Awards
 Tony Award for Best Performance by a Featured Actor in a Musical - Call Me Madam (1951), Goldilocks (1959)
 Theatre World Award - Call Me Madam (1951)

References

1920 births
2018 deaths
Male actors from Illinois
American male film actors
American male musical theatre actors
American male stage actors
American male television actors
American baritones
People from Zion, Illinois
Tony Award winners